The Darwin Medal is one of the medals awarded by the Royal Society for "distinction in evolution, biological diversity and developmental, population and organismal biology". 

In 1885, International Darwin Memorial Fund was transferred to the Royal Society. The fund was devoted for promotion of biological research, and was used to establish the Darwin Medal. The medal was first awarded to Alfred Russel Wallace in 1890 for "his independent origination of the theory of the origin of species by natural selection." The medal commemorates the work of English biologist Charles Darwin (1809–1882). Darwin, most famous for his 1859 book On the Origin of Species, was a fellow of the Royal Society, and had received the Royal Medal in 1853 and the Copley Medal in 1864.

The diameter of the Darwin Medal is  inch (5.7 cm). It is made of silver. The obverse has Darwin's portrait, while the reverse has a wreath of plants with Darwin's name in Latin, "Carolus Darwin". It is surrounded by the years of his birth and death in Roman numerals (MDCCCIX and MDCCCLXXXII). The general design of the medal was by John Evans, the president of the Royal Numismatic Society.

Since its creation the Darwin Medal has been awarded over 60 times. Among the recipients are Francis Darwin, Charles Darwin's son, and two married couples: Jack and Yolande Heslop-Harrison in 1982 and Peter and Rosemary Grant in 2002. Initially accompanied by a grant of £100, the medal is currently awarded with a grant of £2,000. All citizens who have been residents of the United Kingdom, Commonwealth of Nations, or the Republic of Ireland for more than three years are eligible for the medal. The medal was awarded biennially from 1890 until 2018; since then it is awarded annually. The most recent winner of the Darwin Medal is Canadian biologist Dolph Schluter, who received it in 2021.

List of recipients

See also 
Awards, lectures and medals of the Royal Society

References

External links 
 

Awards established in 1890
Awards of the Royal Society
Biennial events
Biology awards
Charles Darwin
1890 establishments in the United Kingdom
1890 in biology